The Scaled Composites Model 348 White Knight Two (WK2) is a quadjet cargo aircraft that is used to lift the SpaceShipTwo spacecraft to release altitude. It was developed by Scaled Composites from 2007 to 2010 as the first stage of Tier 1b, a two-stage to suborbital-space crewed launch system. WK2 is based on the successful mothership to SpaceShipOne, White Knight, which itself is based on Proteus.

With an "open architecture"  design and explicit plans for multi-purpose use, the aircraft could also operate as a zero-g aircraft for passenger training or microgravity science flights, handle missions in high-altitude testing more generally, or be used to launch payloads other than SpaceShipTwo. A study of use of the aircraft as a forest fire water bomber has also been mentioned, one that would utilize a large carbon composite water tank that could be quickly replenished to make repeat runs over fires.

The first White Knight Two is named VMS Eve after Richard Branson's mother Eve Branson; it was officially unveiled on July 28, 2008, and flew for the first time on December 21, 2008.  The second is expected to be named VMS Spirit of Steve Fossett after Branson's close friend Steve Fossett, who died in an aircraft accident in 2007. 
, it is not clear how many SS2 and WK2 vehicles will actually be built.

History 
In 2008, Virgin Galactic ordered two White Knight Two vehicles.  Together, WK2 and SS2 form the basis for Virgin Galactic's fleet of suborbital spaceplanes.

In November 2010, The Spaceship Company had announced that it planned to build at least three additional White Knight Two aircraft and an additional five SpaceShipTwo rocket planes, the aircraft to be built by Virgin after the initial prototypes of each craft are built by Scaled Composites.

During 2012–2014, Virgin Galactic was also considering use of the WhiteKnightTwo as the air-launch platform for a new two-stage liquid-fueled rocket small satellite launcher called LauncherOne.
In the event—by late 2015—they decided to use a larger carrier aircraft for the job.

Design

White Knight Two is roughly three times larger than White Knight in order to perform a captive flight with the larger SpaceShipTwo spacecraft. The WK2 is similar in wingspan to a Boeing B-29 Superfortress. White Knight Two is a very modern aircraft, as  even the flight control cables are constructed of carbon fiber, using a new patented design.

WK2 will provide preview flights offering several seconds of weightlessness before the suborbital event. It is intended to have a service ceiling of about 60,000 ft (18 km), offering a dark blue sky to passengers. This will allow tourists to practice before the real flight.

White Knight Two is of twin fuselage design with four jet engines mounted two on each wing. One fuselage is an exact replica of that of SpaceShipTwo (to allow tourist training), and the other will offer 'cut-rate' trips to the stratosphere.

The design is quite different from the White Knight, both in size, use of tail, engine configuration and placement of cockpit(s). The White Knight uses two T-tails, but the White Knight Two uses two cruciform tails. Engine configuration is also very different. White Knight Two has four engines hung underneath the wings on pylons while White Knight's pair of engines are on either side of its single fuselage.

Timeline of introduction

Virgin Galactic contracted aerospace designer Burt Rutan to build the mothership and spacecraft.

On January 23, 2008 the White Knight Two design was revealed. On July 28, 2008 the completion and rollout of the first aircraft, Eve, (Tail Number: N348MS) occurred at Scaled's Mojave headquarters.  Branson predicted that the maiden space voyage would take place in 18 months: "It represents... the chance for our ever-growing group of future astronauts and other scientists to see our world in a completely new light."

On March 22, 2010 the VMS Eve completed its 25th flight, the first occasion it carried the SpaceShipTwo, VSS Enterprise.
The launch customer of White Knight Two is Virgin Galactic, which will have the first two units, and exclusive rights to the craft for the first few years.

Flight test program

An extensive flight test program of VMS Eve, with nearly twenty flights between December 2008 and August 2009, was undertaken to validate the design and gradually expand the aircraft operating envelope.  The flight tests were complete by September 2009, and testing with SpaceShipTwo began in early 2010.

Aircraft specifications

See also

 Scaled Composites Proteus, predecessor to WhiteKnightOne
 Scaled Composites Stratolaunch Roc, derivative of WhiteKnightTwo
 SpaceShipTwo, payload for WhiteKnightTwo
 WhiteKnightOne, predecessor to WhiteKnightTwo

References

External links

   BBC - In pictures: Space tourism jet
 Video of White Knight Two being unveiled
  Photos of Virgin Galactic’s White Knight Two unveiling
 Photos of cockpit and interior of White Knight Two

 
WK2 VMS
WhiteKnightTwo
White Knight Two
WhiteKnightTwo
Space tourism
2000s United States airliners
Twin-fuselage aircraft
2000s United States special-purpose aircraft
Rutan aircraft
Quadjets
Cruciform tail aircraft
Aircraft first flown in 2008
Aircraft related to spaceflight